The Mingan Archipelago National Park Reserve is a national park reserve located in the eastern area of Quebec, Canada, on the north shore of Gulf of St. Lawrence. It features the Mingan Archipelago, a chain of around 40 islands.

The islands formed as the continent slowly rose after the last glaciation.  Over the course of the last few thousand years, the limestone rocks were slowly eroded by the waves, the changing sea level and the winds, as well as seasonal freezing and thawing.  The result is a unique set of limestone sculptures, which form the largest group of such monoliths in Canada.

Mingan Archipelago was represented in the 2011 documentary film series National Parks Project, with its film directed by Catherine Martin and scored by Sebastien Grainger, Jennifer Castle and Dan Werb.

Fauna
Animals that inhabit this national park are beavers, river otters, muskrats, silver foxes, red squirrels, snowshoe hares, red foxes, ermines, certain species of bats and a number of small rodents. Occasionally, black bears and moose can be found on certain islands near the coast. Birds found on the islands include warblers, buntings, bald eagles, ospreys, passerines, eiders, terns, puffins, razorbills, and shorebirds. Marine animals that inhabit offshore are grey seals, minke whales, dolphins, harbour seals, humpback whales, porpoises, fin whales, and harp seals.

See also
 National Parks of Canada
 List of National Parks of Canada

References

External links

 Official site
 Information from Great Canadian Parks

National parks in Quebec
Protected areas established in 1984
Protected areas of Côte-Nord
Heritage sites in Quebec (Cultural Heritage Act)
1984 establishments in Quebec